Upper Trishuli 3A Hydropower Station (Nepali: माथिल्लो त्रिशुली ३a जलविद्युत आयोजना) is a run-of-river hydro-electric plant located in   Rasuwa District of Nepal. The flow from Trisuli River is used to generate 60 MW electricity.

The plant is owned and developed by Nepal Electricity Authority (NEA). The plant started generating electricity from 2076-05-13 BS. The generation licence will expire in 2102-11-14 BS. The power station is connected to the national grid.

Finance
The total project cost was US$125.775 million. The project was funded Government of Nepal through NEA and the loan provided by China Exim Bank.

See also

List of power stations in Nepal

References

Hydroelectric power stations in Nepal
Gravity dams
Run-of-the-river power stations
Dams in Nepal
Irrigation in Nepal
2019 establishments in Nepal
Buildings and structures in Rasuwa District